Thomas Lundmark (born 28 June 1963) is a retired Swedish footballer. He made 86 Allsvenskan appearances (9 goals) for AIK and 56 Allsvenskan appearances (6 goals) for Djurgårdens IF.

References

Swedish footballers
Vasalunds IF players
IF Brommapojkarna players
AIK Fotboll players
IFK Eskilstuna players
Djurgårdens IF Fotboll players
AFC Eskilstuna players
1963 births
Living people
Association footballers not categorized by position